Henry Tichborne (6 September 1756 – 14 June 1821) was the 7th Baronet Tichborne of Tichborne in Hampshire.

He was born in 1756, the son of Sir Henry Tichborne, the 6th Baronet, and Mary née Blount. On 8 March 1778 he married Elizabeth Lucy Plowden (1758–1829), the eldest daughter of Edmund Plowden of Plowden Hall in Plowden in Shropshire. The Plowdens, like the Tichborne's, were an old Catholic family. The couple had seven sons and a daughter. Their sons included: Sir Henry Joseph Tichborne, the 8th Baronet Tichborne (1779–1845); Sir Edward Doughty, the 9th Baronet (1782–1853), and Sir James Francis Doughty-Tichborne, the 10th Baronet Tichborne (1784–1862). Built by his father the 6th Baronet in 1760, in 1789 Tichborne sold the family estate of Frimley Manor to James Lawrell the elder for £20,000.

In 1803 Sir Henry Tichborne was captured by the French in Verdun during the Napoleonic Wars and detained as a civil prisoner for some years. With him in captivity were his fourth son, James Tichborne, and Henry Seymour of Knoyle, an English nobleman. Seymour had an affair with Felicity Dailly-Brimont, reputedly the illegitimate daughter of the Duc de Bourbon and his mistress Marie Claude Gaucher-Dailly which resulted in a daughter, Henriette Felicité (c1807–1868). She married James Tichborne in August 1827 and in 1829 gave birth to Roger Charles Doughty Tichborne, the grandson of Henry Tichborne, the 8th Baronet, and later to be the subject of the infamous Tichborne case.

Sir Henry was succeeded in 1821 by his eldest son, Henry Joseph Tichborne (1779–1845), the 8th Baronet Tichborne. He fathered seven daughters but no male heir (see the curse connected with the Tichborne Dole). When Henry Joseph died in 1845 the immediate heir as 9th Baronet Tichborne was his younger brother Edward Doughty, who had assumed the surname of Doughty as a condition of a legacy.  Edward's only son died in childhood, so James Tichborne became next in line to the baronetcy, and after him his son, Roger Tichborne.

He is buried with his family in St Andrew's Church in Tichborne in Hampshire.

References

 

1756 births
1821 deaths
Baronets in the Baronetage of England
English Roman Catholics
People from the City of Winchester
Tichborne baronets